German submarine U-394 was a Type VIIC U-boat of Nazi Germany's Kriegsmarine during World War II.

She carried out two patrols. She did not sink or damage any ships.

She was sunk by a British aircraft and warships in the Norwegian Sea on 2 September 1944.

Design
German Type VIIC submarines were preceded by the shorter Type VIIB submarines. U-394 had a displacement of  when at the surface and  while submerged. She had two shafts and two  propellers.

U-394 was fitted with five  torpedo tubes (four fitted at the bow and one at the stern), fourteen torpedoes, one  SK C/35 naval gun, (220 rounds), one  Flak M42 and two twin  C/30 anti-aircraft guns. The boat had a complement of between forty-four and sixty.

Service history
The submarine was laid down on 31 January 1941 at the Howaldtswerke (yard) at Flensburg as yard number 26, launched on 19 June 1943 and commissioned on 7 August under the command of Oberleutnant zur See Ernst-Günther Unterhorst.

The boat was a member of two wolfpacks.

She served with the 5th U-boat Flotilla from 7 August 1943 and the 1st flotilla from 1 April 1944. She was reassigned to the 11th flotilla on 1 June.

Her first patrol was preceded by a series of short journey from Kiel in Germany to Arendal (northeast of Kristiansand), Bergen and Narvik in Norway.

First patrol
The boat departed Narvik on 1 June 1944. She was soon sweeping the Norwegian Sea between Jan Mayen island and the Norwegian mainland. She arrived at Hammerfest on 8 July.

Second patrol and loss
U-394 left Hammerfest on 27 July 1944. She patrolled the Greenland and Barents seas.

50 men died in the U-boat; there were no survivors.

Wolfpacks
U-394 took part in two wolfpacks, namely:
 Trutz (2 June – 6 July 1944) 
 Trutz (17 August – 2 September 1944)

References

Bibliography

External links

German Type VIIC submarines
U-boats commissioned in 1943
U-boats sunk in 1944
U-boats sunk by depth charges
1943 ships
Ships built in Kiel
Ships lost with all hands
U-boats sunk by British warships
U-boats sunk by British aircraft
World War II submarines of Germany
World War II shipwrecks in the Norwegian Sea
Maritime incidents in September 1944